Events from the year 2002 in Kuwait.

Incumbents
Emir: Jaber Al-Ahmad Al-Jaber Al-Sabah
Prime Minister: Saad Al-Salim Al-Sabah

Events

 Kuwaiti Premier League 2001–02.
 Kuwaiti Premier League 2002–03.

References

 
Kuwait
Kuwait
Years of the 21st century in Kuwait
2000s in Kuwait